Golden Myanmar Airlines was an airline in Myanmar that operated domestic and international flights. It was established in August 2012. It was formed by 15 investors including the chairmen of CB Bank and Myanmar Golden Star. The company slogan was Enjoy to fly more.

The airline ceased flight operations on March 27, 2022.

Destinations
As of September 2021, Golden Myanmar Airlines flew to the following destinations:

Fleet

Current fleet

At the time of shutting down, the Golden Myanmar Airlines fleet consisted of the following aircraft:

Former fleet
The airline operated a single leased Airbus A320 from 2012 to 2016. A further leased Airbus A320 was operated from 2013 to 2014 until damaged beyond repair.

The airline also operated the following aircraft (as of August 2022):
 2 further ATR 72-600

Incidents and accidents
On 14 April 2014 an Airbus A320 of Golden Myanmar Airlines was damaged beyond repair at Yangon International Airport when it impacted the rear fuselage of another aircraft while being towed. The airframe was preserved in 2016 at Bago, Myanmar and used as a restaurant.

See also
List of defunct airlines of Myanmar

References

External links

Airlines of Myanmar
Airlines established in 2012
Airlines disestablished in 2022
2012 establishments in Myanmar